Traveler is a South Korean television entertainment program which airs on JTBC. It is about actors going on a backpacking trip.

The first season features Ryu Jun-yeol and Lee Je-hoon as they travel to Cuba. It aired on Thursdays from 21 February to 25 April 2019.

The second season features Ahn Jae-hong, Kang Ha-neul and Ong Seong-wu as they travel to Argentina. It was broadcast on Saturdays from 15 February to 18 April 2020.

Overview

Season 1
The program is about two travelers, who went to Cuba, that combines trips and documentaries whom take a backpacking trip and enjoy a variety of experiences in the local area. For two weeks (26 December 2018 – 10 January 2019), both travelers backpacked in Cuba to learn about Che Guevara's freedom and revolution, Buena Vista Social Club's brilliant melodies and enjoy the refreshing feeling of old cars (1950s to 1970s) and mojito. This backpacking trip is without the interference of the production crews and both travelers have to make decisions of their choice together on finding private accommodations, known as casa, eating and transportation.

Season 2
New travelers Ahn Jae-hong, Kang Ha-neul and Ong Seong-wu visit Argentina. For two weeks (30 November – 12 December 2019), the trio became real travelers in the original landscape of Argentina and enjoyed the beauty of a dozen times more colorful than their changing attire. They will go to places like Iguazu Falls,  Perito Moreno Glacier and fighting against the wind on the road across Patagonia.

Airtime

Cast

Season 1

Season 2

Episodes

Season 1 (2019)

Season 2 (2020)

Original soundtrack

Part 1

Part 2

Part 3

Part 4

Part 5

Ratings
In these tables,  represent the lowest ratings and  represent the highest ratings.

Season 1

Season 2

References

External links
 
 

JTBC original programming
2019 South Korean television series debuts
2020 South Korean television series endings
Korean-language television shows
South Korean variety television shows
South Korean travel television series